is an American football sports video game that was developed and published in Japan by Irem for arcades in 1983. It was published overseas by Taito in the Americas, by Electrocoin in Europe, and by ADP Automaten GmbH in West Germany.

Gameplay

10-Yard Fight is viewed in a top-down perspective and is vertical scrolling. The player does not select plays for either offense or defense. On offense, the player simply receives the ball upon the snap and either attempts to run with the quarterback, toss the ball to a running back, or throw the ball to the one long distance receiver – basically the option offense. On defense, the player chooses one of two players to control, and the computer manipulates the others. The ball can also be punted or a field goal can be attempted.

The game has five levels of increasing difficulty: high school, college, professional, playoff, and Super Bowl. If the player wins both halves of an "accelerated real time" 30-minute half at an easier level, the player advances to the next level of difficulty, like a career mode.

A player scores 20,000 points for any kickoff that is returned for a touchdown.

Ports

The arcade game was later ported to the Famicom by Irem first in Japan, and later published in North America and Europe by Nintendo in 1985 for the Nintendo Entertainment System (NES). The arcade game was also ported to the MSX home computer also by Irem, but exclusively in Japan.

While graphically similar, there are some fundamental differences between the arcade and NES versions of the game. The arcade version only seeks to simulate the offense, with the team attempting to score a touchdown, which ultimately leads the player to the next level. The NES version was developed to allow both defense and offense, as well as a simultaneous 2-player mode.

10-Yard Fight was, along with Kung Fu, one of only two NES launch titles not originally developed by Nintendo. Both games were developed initially for arcades by Irem. Although Nintendo developed the NES port of Kung Fu, Irem handled the system's port of 10-Yard Fight.

On May 2, 2018 a port for the Nintendo Switch was released by HAMSTER as part of their Arcade Archives series.

Reception
In Japan,  listed 10-Yard Fight on their January 1, 1984 issue as the top-grossing new table arcade cabinet of the month. It later topped Japan's table arcade game chart in March 1984.

The Pittsburgh Post-Gazette called it the "patriarch of football games". Adam Duerson of Sports Illustrated stated that while no one remembered it or could say what makes it great, it is worth recognition for the fact that it brought football games out of the Atari era, setting a simple precedent for future football games. Adam Swiderski of UGO Networks called it "downright advanced" compared to earlier football titles. He added that while it looked neat and had a quality soundtrack, it didn't play like "real football". N-Sider called it more like a racing game than a football game, due to the objective being racing for a first down to increase players' time. Author Bj Klein, however, called it less realistic than Tecmo Bowl. The Journal News called it an "immortal classic".

Legacy
A remake of the game has been announced for release exclusively for the Intellivision Amico.

See also 
 Gridiron Fight

Notes

References

External links
10-Yard Fight at arcade-history

1983 video games
American football video games
Arcade video games
MSX games
Nintendo Entertainment System games
Nintendo Switch games
Nintendo Vs. Series games
PlayStation 4 games
Irem games
Video games developed in Japan
Hamster Corporation games